Kahn-e Mur (also Romanized as Kahn-e Mūr, Kahnemūr, Kahn Mūr, and Kohan Moor; also known as Kanmūr) is a village in Balvard Rural District, in the Central District of Sirjan County, Kerman Province, Iran. At the 2006 census, its population was 65, in 16 families.

References 

Populated places in Sirjan County